The flag of Krasnodar, in the Russian Federation, is a horizontal tricolour of blue, pink and green charged with the golden coat of arms of Krasnodar Krai — five monograms of  Empress Catherine II and Emperor Alexander I (placed together), Emperors Paul I and Nicholas I (placed together), and Emperor Alexander II (in the center)

The flag was adopted on 24 March 1995 by the Legislative Assembly of Krasnodar Krai, and was modified on 23 June 2004.

See also 

 Flag of Kuban, the origin of the tricolour

References

Flag
Flags of the federal subjects of Russia
Krasnodar Krai